Streptomyces araujoniae is a bacterium species from the genus of Streptomyces which has been isolated from a potato tubercle.

See also
 List of Streptomyces species

References

Further reading
 
 

araujoniae
Bacteria described in 2014